Kateya Assembly constituency was an assembly constituency in Gopalganj district in the Indian state of Bihar.

Overview
It was part of Gopalganj Lok Sabha constituency.

As a consequence of the orders of the Delimitation Commission of India, Kateya Assembly constituency ceased to exist in 2010. Police station and various public departments are located here.

Election results
In the October 2005 and February 2005 state assembly elections, Amarendra Kumar Pandey of BSP won the Kateya assembly seat defeating his nearest rival Kiran Devi of RJD. Contests in most years were multi cornered but only winners and runners are being mentioned. Kiran Devi of RJD defeated Man Deo Tiwari of BJP in 2000. Sinheswar Shahi of JD defeated Bachcha Choubey of Congress in 1995. Bachcha Choubey of Congress defeated Nagina Rai of JD. Bachcha Choubey representing Janata Party defeated Manoj Kumar Mishra of Congress in 1985. Sihaswar Sahi of Congress defeated Bachcha Choubey representing BJP in 1980. Nagina Rai representing Congress defeated Rajmangal Mishra of Janata Party in 1977.

References

Former assembly constituencies of Bihar
Politics of East Champaran district